This article is about the demographic features of the population of Burundi, including population density, ethnicity, education level, health of the populace, economic status, religious affiliations and other aspects of the population.

At 206.1 persons per km², Burundi has the second-largest population density in Sub-Saharan Africa. Most people live on farms near areas of fertile volcanic soil. The population is made up of three major ethnic groups – Hutu (Bahutu), Tutsi (Batutsi or Watusi), and Twa (Batwa). Kirundi is the common language. Intermarriage takes place frequently between the Hutus and Tutsis. The terms "pastoralist" and "agriculturist", often used as ethnic designations for Watusi and Bahutu, respectively, are only occupational titles which vary among individuals and groups. Although Hutus encompass the majority of the population, historically Tutsis have been politically and economically dominant.

Population

The proportion of children below the age of 15 in 2020 was 45.3%, 52.4% were between 15 and 65 years of age, while 2.4% of the population was 65 years or older.
.

Population Estimates by Sex and Age Group (01.VII.2015):

Population Estimates by Sex and Age Group (01.VII.2020):

UN population projections
Numbers are in thousands. UN medium variant projections

2020 11,891
2025 13,764
2030 15,773
2035 17,932
2040 20,253
2045 22,728
2050 25,325

Vital statistics
Registration of vital events is in Burundi not complete. The Population Departement of the United Nations prepared the following estimates.

Source: UN DESA, World Population Prospects, 2022

Fertility and births
Total Fertility Rate (TFR) (Wanted Fertility Rate) and Crude Birth Rate (CBR):

Fertility data as of 2010 (DHS Program): The fertility rate in the Bujumbura Mairie Province fell to 3.7 by 2016-2017; the other regions were not aggregated in the report, for easy reference and comparison to the below chart. Per the 2016-2017 report, the average number of desired children in Burundi, nationwide, by both men and women of 15 to 49 years of age who are either paired up or married, is 4 children or less, and slightly less for men than for women. Per the report, this suggests an excess fecundity (more children than desired) of 1.8 children per couple nationwide; 1.1 in urban areas (where 3.0 children are desired, and the fertility rate is 4.1) and 2.0 in rural areas (where 3.7 children are desired and the fertility rate is 5.7). However, the number of desired children appears to be based on the lowest-desired rate - that of paired but unmarried men (3.7 children) rather than the highest (4.0, desired by married women) or even an overall average.

Other demographic statistics 

Demographic statistics according to the World Population Review in 2019.

One birth every 1 minutes	
One death every 6 minutes	
One net migrant every 288 minutes	
Net gain of one person every 1 minutes

The following demographic statistics are from the CIA World Factbook, unless otherwise indicated.

Population
12,696,478 (2022 est.)
12,241,065 (July 2021 est.)
10,742,276 (July 2015 est.)
Note: estimates for this country explicitly take into account the effects of excess mortality due to AIDS; this can result in lower life expectancy, higher infant mortality and death rates, lower population and growth rates, and changes in the distribution of population by age and sex than would otherwise be expected (July 2015 est.)

Religions
Roman Catholic 58.6%, Protestant 35.3% (includes Adventist 2.7% and other Protestant 32.6%), Muslim 3.4%, other 1.3%, none 1.3% (2016-17 est.)

Age structure

0-14 years: 43.83% (male 2,618,868/female 2,581,597)
15-24 years: 19.76% (male 1,172,858/female 1,171,966)
25-54 years: 29.18% (male 1,713,985/female 1,748,167)
55-64 years: 4.17% (male 231,088/female 264,131)
65 years and over: 3.06% (male 155,262/female 207,899) (2020 est.)

Median age
Total: 17.7 years. Country comparison to the world: 217th
Male: 17.4 years 
Female: 18.0 years (2020 est.)

Total: 17.0 years
Male: 16.8 years
Female: 17.2 years (2015 est.)

Population growth rate
3.63% (2022 est.) Country comparison to the world: 4th
3.68% (2021 est.) 
3.28% (2015 est.)

Total fertility rate
5.03 children born/woman (2022 est.) Country comparison to the world: 10th
5.1 children born/woman (2021 est.)

Birth rate
35.17 births/1,000 population (2022 est.) Country comparison to the world: 16th
35.48 births/1,000 population (2021 est.) Country comparison to the world: 16th

Death rate
5.96 deaths/1,000 population (2022 est.) Country comparison to the world: 161st
6.07 deaths/1,000 population (2021 est.)

Net migration rate
7.09 migrant(s)/1,000 population (2022 est.) Country comparison to the world: 12nd
7.35 migrant(s)/1,000 population (2021 est.)
4.04 migrant(s)/1,000 population (2009 est.)

Population distribution
One of Africa's most densely populated countries; concentrations tend to be in the north and along the northern shore of Lake Tanganyika in the west; most people live on farms near areas of fertile volcanic soil

Urbanization
urban population: 14.4% of total population (2022)
rate of urbanization: 5.43% annual rate of change (2020-25 est.)

Urban population: 13.7% of total population (2020)
Rate of urbanization: 5.68% annual rate of change (2015-20 est.)

Mother's mean age at first birth
21.5 years (2016/17 est.)
note: median age at first birth among women 25-49

21.3 years (2010 est.)
note: median age at first birth among women 25-29

Sex ratio
At birth: 1.03 male(s)/female
Under 15 years: 1.01 male(s)/female
15-64 years: 0.98 male(s)/female
65 years and over: 0.87 male(s)/female
Total population: 0.99 male(s)/female (2020 est.)

Life expectancy at birth
total population: 67.42 years. Country comparison to the world: 190th
male: 65.32 years
female: 69.59 years (2022 est.)

Total population: 67.07 years Country comparison to the world: 150th
male: 64.98 years
female: 69.22 years (2021 est.)

Total population: 60.9 years
Male: 59.2 years
Female: 62.7 years (2017 est.)

Dependency ratios
Total dependency ratio: 91.0
Youth dependency ratio: 86.4
Elderly dependency ratio: 4.5
Potential support ratio: 22.0 (2020 est.)

Contraceptive prevalence rate
28.5% (2016/17)

HIV/AIDS
Adult prevalence rate: 1.2% (2019 est.) Country comparison to the world (37th)
People living with HIV/AIDS: 85,000 (2019 est.)
Deaths: 1,800 (2019 est.)

Children under the age of 5 years underweight
27.2% (2018/2019)

Major infectious diseases
Degree of risk: very high
Food or waterborne diseases: bacterial and protozoal diarrhea, hepatitis A, and typhoid fever
Vectorborne disease: malaria and dengue fever
Water contact disease: schistosomiasis
Animal contact disease: rabies (2020)

Nationality
Noun: Burundian(s)
Adjective: Burundian

Ethnic groups

Hutu (Bantu) 85%, Tutsi 14%, Twa (Pygmy) 1% Europeans 3,000, South Asians 2,000

Religions

Roman Catholic 62.1%, Protestant 23.9% (includes Adventist 2.3% and other Protestant 21.6%), Islam 2.5%, Other 3.6%, Unspecified 7.9% (2008 est.)

Languages

Kirundi (official) only: 29.7%, French (official) only: 0.3%, Kirundi and French: 8.4%, Kurundi, French and English: 2.4%, Swahili only: 0.2%, other language combinations: 2%, unspecified: 56.9% (2008 est.)
NOTE: Data represents only languages read and written by people 10 years of age or older; spoken Kirundi is nearly universal.

Literacy
Definition: age 15 and over can read and write
Total population: 68.4%
Male: 76.3%
Female: 61.2% (2017 est.)

School life expectancy (primary to tertiary education)
total: 11 years
male: 11 years
female: 11 years (2018)

Education expenditure
5.1% of GDP (2018)

References

Attribution:

 
Society of Burundi

pt:Burundi#Demografia